Allocasuarina littoralis, commonly known as black sheoak, black she-oak, or river black-oak, is an endemic medium-sized Australian tree (usually up to 8 metres, but sometimes to 15 metres - coarse shrub in exposed maritime areas). A. littoralis is named for its growth near the coast; this is somewhat misleading, as it will grow well both inland and in coastal zones. Studies have shown that in long-time unburnt coastal woodlands, A. littoralis has replaced the original Eucalyptus-dominated woodland.

Description
This evergreen Casaurina tree is noted for its modified branchlets appearing to be leaves (5–8 cm long) and narrow width (no more than 4 mm) and the true leaves are, in fact minute (rarely larger than 1mm) and occur on the tips of the modified branchlets. It is a relatively fast growing tree (up to 800mm. a year) making it very suitable for planting along roadsides. The showy red female flowers appear in spring. It is usually dioecious.

Range
The species occurs in Queensland, New South Wales, Australian Capital Territory, Victoria, and Tasmania. It grows in woodland and sometimes in tall heath, and it grows in sandy and other poor soils.

References

External links

  Occurrence data for Allocasuarina littoralis from The Australasian Virtual Herbarium

littoralis
Trees of Australia
Fagales of Australia
Flora of Queensland
Flora of New South Wales
Flora of the Australian Capital Territory
Flora of Victoria (Australia)
Flora of Tasmania
Dioecious plants